Radomir Naumov (12 May 1946 – 22 May 2015) was a Serbian politician and engineer. He served as the Minister of Religion from 2007 to 2008, and as the Minister of Mining and Energy from 2004 to 2007.

Naumov graduated from the University of Belgrade Faculty of Electrical Engineering. He worked at the Nikola Tesla Electrical Engineering Institute for many years. Naumov was president of Belgrade office of the Democratic Party of Serbia. He was married with two children.

References

External links

1946 births
2015 deaths
People from Čoka
University of Belgrade School of Electrical Engineering alumni
Democratic Party of Serbia politicians
Government ministers of Serbia